The David Lewis Northern Hospital was located in Great Howard Street, Liverpool. It was first established in 1834 and closed in 1978.

History
The hospital had its origins in a facility which was established in Leeds Street to deal with victims of accidents and emergencies in the dock area and which opened as the Northern Hospital in March 1834. It moved to a purpose-built hospital, designed by Edward Welch, in Great Howard Street in September 1845.

The foundation stone for a re-built facility on the same site, financed by the David Lewis Trust, was laid by the Earl of Derby in October 1896 and the new facility was opened by Princess Louise as the David Lewis Northern Hospital in March 1902. It joined the National Health Service in 1948. After services transferred to the Royal Liverpool Hospital, the David Lewis Northern Hospital closed in 1978.

References

External links

Hospitals in Liverpool
Defunct hospitals in England
1902 establishments in England
1978 disestablishments in England